Madan Pande (25 December 1943 – 28 April 2014) was an Indian cricketer. He played four first-class matches for Vidarbha between 1960 and 1962.

References

External links
 

1943 births
2014 deaths
Indian cricketers
Vidarbha cricketers
Cricketers from Nagpur